is a centaur, approximately  in diameter, orbiting the Sun in the outer Solar System. The object is also a promising Uranus horseshoe librator candidate. It was first observed on 13 March 2010, by American astronomers David Rabinowitz and Suzanne Tourtellotte, observing from Cerro Tololo and La Silla Observatory in Chile. , it has neither been numbered nor named.

Orbit and classification 

 is classified as a centaur, a group of non-resonant small Solar System bodies whose orbit around the Sun lie typically between the orbits of Jupiter and Neptune (5 to 30 AU). Centaurs are minor planets with characteristics of comets, and often classified as such. The dynamical group is formed due to Neptune's eroding effect on the Kuiper belt by means of gravitational scattering, sending objects inward to become centaurs, or outward to become scattered-disc objects, or removing them from the Solar System entirely. Centaurs themselves have unstable orbits with short lifetimes, transitioning from the inactive population of Kuiper belt objects to the active group of Jupiter-family comets within approximately one million years.

It orbits the Sun at a distance of 17.0–22.9 AU once every 89 years and 3 months (32,606 days; semi-major axis of 19.97 AU). Its orbit has an eccentricity of 0.15 and an inclination of 15° with respect to the ecliptic. It has a Tisserand's parameter with respect to Jupiter (TJ) of 2.94, near the threshold of 3, typically used to distinguish asteroids from Jupiter-family comets. On 21 June 2021, the object came to perihelion at 17.0 AU and has since been moving away from the Sun.  the object is at 17.009 AU, with a apparent magnitude of 21.71. The body's observation arc begins with a precovery observation taken by the Mount Lemmon Survey in April 2009.

Uranus horseshoe candidate 

Based on its current heliocentric orbit,  follows a horseshoe orbit around Uranus'  point. Giving the fact that its orbit is, at present, poorly determined, the object is a promising Uranus horseshoe orbiter candidate.

Physical properties 

 has an absolute magnitude of 9.1.

See also

Notes

References

External links 
 Image of 
 Early announcement
  data at MPC
 IAU list of centaurs and scattered-disk objects
 IAU list of trans-neptunian objects
 

20100313

Uranus co-orbital minor planets

Minor planet object articles (unnumbered)